Sonny Hall (born 10 June 1998) is an English model, artist and poet. Hall released his debut poetry collection, The Blues Comes With Good News, through Hodder & Stoughton in September 2019. He is signed to Kate Moss's modelling agency.

Early life 
Hall was born in Essex. From ages 3 to 4 he moved between foster homes with his twin brother, Harvey. They were eventually adopted at age 4. And then raised in Wandsworth, south west London and Surrey. He did maintain contact with his birth mother. He dropped out of sixth form in 2014. He began using drugs in his teenage years, but fell into an addiction soon after his birth mother died of a heroin overdose in 2015. He rehabilitated at The Cabin Chiang Mai addiction clinic in Chiang Mai, Thailand in 2017.

Career 
Hall's career started when he was scouted at a gig in Camden Town circa 2014. In 2015, he modelled in British fashion photographer Nick Knight's fashion film, Yungsters. Hall first began writing in 2017 when he was in rehab in Thailand. He shortly began posting his own poetry on his personal Instagram account. Hall self published and released his debut poetry collection The Blues Comes With Good News, in April 2019 which sold over 1.5 thousand copies with its first edition in just six months. A subsequent 2nd Edition was published in September 2019 by British publishing house Hodder & Stoughton.  He consequently was hired by British fashion designer Christopher Bailey for one of his Burberry campaigns alongside model Adwoa Aboah. Hall's Instagram also caught the attention of British singer Rita Ora who starred him in her music video for her smash hit single "Let You Love Me". Hall collaborated with friend and film director Jim Longden, where he played the lead role in Longden’s directing debut, To Erase A Cloud.

References 

Living people
1998 births
Models from London
English male models
English male poets
21st-century English poets